Ermengarda de Vallespir (died 1001) was countess consort of Pallars by marriage to Oliba Cabreta and regent of the County of Cerdanya in 990-994 in co-regency with her sons Bernard I, Count of Besalú, Wifred II, Count of Cerdanya and Abbot Oliba.

Life
Ermengarda was daughter of Count Gausbert, Count of Empúries. She married count Oliba Cabreta in 966. With her spouse, she made many donations to convents. In 988, Oliba retired to a convent, and in 990, he died. Oliba divided his domain among his three sons, and Ermengard acted as their regent in accordance with the terms of her marriage contract. In 991, she became involved in a conflict with the bishop Sal la d’Urgell.

In 993, her three sons attained full authority of their domains, and by 994, Ermengarda had retired to Vallespir. She governed Vallespir with full authority as her own fief. She is known to be dead in 14 February 1001.

 Issue 
Bernard I, Count of Besalú
Wifred II, Count of Cerdanya
Abbot Oliba
Adelaida, married John d'Oriol, lord of Sales

References
 «Diccionari Biogràfic de Dones: Goltregoda, de Cerdanya»
 Abadal i de Vinyals, Ramon d' (2003). L'abat Oliba, bisbe de Vic i la seva època. Pamplona: Urgoiti.

Year of birth missing
10th-century women rulers
10th-century Catalan people
Regents of Spain
Spanish countesses
1001 deaths 
10th-century Spanish women
11th-century Spanish women
11th-century Catalan people